Johan Kjølstad (born 9 March 1983) is a Norwegian cross-country skier who has competed since 2002.

Born in Levanger, he represents the sports club Skogn IL.

Competing in two Winter Olympics, he earned his best finish of seventh in the individual sprint event at Turin in 2006. He finished sixth overall in the Sprint Cup at the 2007-08 Cross-country Skiing World Cup, and won one of the races.

At the 2009 FIS Nordic World Ski Championships, Kjølstad won the sprint prologue before American Andrew Newell and Russian Alexei Petukhov. In the quarter finals, Kjølstad progressed alongside Swiss World Cup leader Dario Cologna. Then, Kjølstad defeated Nikolay Morilov in the semi final and went to the final heat, being a medal favourite. Here, he fought with Ola Vigen Hattestad for the gold, having broken free from the other four competitors. At the sprint final, Vigen Hattestad defeated Kjølstad who grabbed the silver medal. The following day, Kjølstad teamed up with Vigen Hattestad to win gold in the team sprint event.

Cross-country skiing results
All results are sourced from the International Ski Federation (FIS).

Olympic Games

World Championships
 2 medals – (1 gold, 1 silver)

World Cup

Season standings

Individual podiums
 3 victories – (2 , 1 ) 
 7 podiums – (6 , 1 )

Team podiums
 2 victories (2 ) 
 4 podiums (4 )

References

External links
 
 
 

1983 births
Cross-country skiers at the 2006 Winter Olympics
Cross-country skiers at the 2010 Winter Olympics
Living people
Norwegian male cross-country skiers
Olympic cross-country skiers of Norway
People from Levanger
FIS Nordic World Ski Championships medalists in cross-country skiing
Sportspeople from Trøndelag